{{DISPLAYTITLE:C20H32O3}}
The molecular formula C20H32O3 may refer to:

 Epoxyeicosatrienoic acids
 Hydroxyeicosatetraenoic acids
 5-Hydroxyeicosatetraenoic acid 
 12-Hydroxyeicosatetraenoic acid 
 15-Hydroxyeicosatetraenoic acid
 20-Hydroxyeicosatetraenoic acid
 19-Hydroxyeicosatetraenoic acid (see 20-Hydroxyeicosatetraenoic acid)
 Isocupressic acid